Lamisha Musonda (born 27 March 1992) is a Belgian former footballer.

Club career
Musonda joined Chelsea along with his brothers Tika and Charly Jr. in 2012 from Anderlecht.

In January 2014, Chelsea decided to sell Musonda to KV Mechelen. Musonda made his Belgian Pro League debut at 8 March 2014 against Standard Liège. He replaced Boubacar Diabang Dialiba as an 88th-minute substitute. On 1 July 2014, Mechelen announced that they would not be renewing Musonda contract, therefore leading to the expiry of his contract.

On 22 August 2017, Musonda joined Spanish side Llagostera along with his brother, Tika after three years without a club.

After a spell in Spain, Musonda joined Mazembe in November 2018.

Personal life
He is the son of former footballer Charly Musonda. He has two brothers: Tika, born 1994, who also plays for the Llagostera reserves and Charly Jr., born 1996, who plays for Levante UD.

External links
 
 
 
 Spanish football stats at La Preferente

References

1992 births
Living people
Belgian footballers
Belgian people of Zambian descent
Chelsea F.C. players
K.V. Mechelen players
UE Costa Brava players
Belgian Pro League players
Footballers from Brussels
Association football midfielders
Palamós CF footballers